The second season of Rapunzel's Tangled Adventure premiered on June 24, 2018 and concluded on April 14, 2019. The series was renamed from Tangled: The Series to Rapunzel's Tangled Adventure prior to the premiere.

Episodes

Soundtrack

Rapunzel's Tangled Adventure (Music from the TV Series) is the third soundtrack album from the Tangled franchise. It was released on April 12, 2019, by Walt Disney Records.

Track listing

References

Tangled (franchise)
2018 American television seasons
2019 American television seasons
2019 soundtrack albums
Walt Disney Records soundtracks